Aschersleben/Land is a former Verwaltungsgemeinschaft ("collective municipality") in the Salzlandkreis district, in Saxony-Anhalt, Germany. The seat of the Verwaltungsgemeinschaft was in Aschersleben. It was disbanded in January 2009.

At the end of 2008, the Verwaltungsgemeinschaft Aschersleben/Land consisted of the following municipalities:

 Aschersleben
 Groß Schierstedt 
 Schackenthal 
 Westdorf

References

Former Verwaltungsgemeinschaften in Saxony-Anhalt